The Brotherhood of Hope (abbreviated B.H.) is an association of the faithful in the Catholic Church, composed primarily of religious brothers who serve in college campus ministry.

Early history 
The association was founded in 1980 in Newark, New Jersey by Father Philip Merdinger, a Catholic priest from the Roman Catholic Archdiocese of Newark, and five lay men who came together to consecrate themselves to God through private vows.

This new community had been formed by an association of charismatic Catholic families in New Jersey known as the People of Hope and from the inspiration of an ecumenical group of consecrated men in Michigan called the Servants of the Word.

Their first apostolate was in New Jersey, serving students at Rutgers University. In 1995 they were invited by Cardinal Bernard Law to establish their headquarters in the Roman Catholic Archdiocese of Boston, with canonical approval in 1998.

Description
The Brotherhood of Hope serves Catholic campus ministries at Florida State University, University of Central Florida, Northeastern University, Rutgers University, and the University of Minnesota.

In December 2012, Father Robert W. Oliver, a member of the Brotherhood of Hope, was appointed by Pope Benedict XVI to the Promoter of Justice for the Congregation for the Doctrine of the Faith.  In September 2014, Oliver was promoted by Pope Francis to be the first secretary of the Pontifical Commission for the Protection of Minors.

References

Further reading 
 Graves, Jim, "Religious brothers celebrate 35 years ministering to college students", The Catholic World Report, November 11, 2015
 Graves, Jim, "On campus, brothers are professors of faith Members of the religious order the Brotherhood of Hope evangelize students at secular colleges", Our Sunday Visitor, OSV Newsweekly, August 26, 2015

External links 
 Brotherhood of Hope website

Associations of the Christian faithful